The Krimml Waterfalls, with a total height of 380 metres (1,247 feet), are the highest waterfall in Austria.  The falls are on the Krimmler Ache river and are located near the village of Krimml in the High Tauern National Park in Salzburg state.

Falls

Krimmler Waterfalls is a tiered waterfall.  The waterfall begins at the top of the Krimmler Ache valley, and plunges downward in three stages. The upper stage has a drop of 140 metres, the middle of 100 metres, and the lowest a drop of 140 metres. The highest point of the waterfall is 1,470 metres above sea level.

Flow
The Krimmler Ache is a glacial stream whose flow varies greatly with season. Its volumetric flow in June and July is 5.6 m3/s (about 5.28 million gallons per hour), while in February it is only 0.14 m3/s (about 0.13 million gallons per hour). The greatest measured flow was on 25 August 1987, when it was 166.7 m3/s, or almost 160 million gallons per hour.

After the falls, the river joins the Salzach, which flows to the Inn, then into the River Danube and finally to the Black Sea.

Tourism
To ensure that tourists could see more of the waterfall without difficulty, Ignaz von Kürsinger, from Mittersill, created a path to the upper part of the waterfall. In 1879, the Austrian Alpine Club improved the road to provide a more panoramic view. About 400,000 people visit the falls annually. The misty spray of the waterfall creates ideal growth condition for hundreds of mosses, lichens and ferns. The surroundings are the habitat for 62 bird species.

There is a negative impact on the local residents due to the high traffic level in a small village, and because of erosion to the road.

References

Information
 Slupetzky, Heinz and Johannes Wiesenegger. 1993. Vom Schnee, Eis, Schmelzwasser und Regen zum Gletscherbach – Hydrologie der Krimmler Ache In: Krimmler Wasserfälle, Festschrift 25 Jahre Europäisches Naturschutzdiplom 1967-1992, Innsbruck Austria. ["From snow, ice, melt-water and rain to glacial stream - Hydrology of the Krimmler Ache"]
 Stocker, Erich. 1993. Zur Geomorphologie der Krimmler Wasserfälle In: Krimmler Wasserfälle, Festschrift 25 Jahre Europäisches Naturschutzdiplom 1967-1992, Innsbruck Austria. ["On the geomorphology of the Krimmler Wasserfälle"]

External links
 Krimmler Wasserfälle web-site (in English)
Krimmler Wasserfälle at Salzburger-Saalachtal (in German)
Krimmler Wasserfalle stats on World Waterfall Database
Pictures and travel information on European waterfalls (in English)

Waterfalls of Austria
Landforms of Salzburg (state)
Venediger Group
Tourist attractions in Salzburg (state)